Dodona eugenes, the Tailed Punch, is a small but striking butterfly found in the Indomalayan realm that belongs to the Punches and Judies, that is, the family Riodinidae.

Description

From Charles Thomas Bingham (1905) The Fauna of British India, Including Ceylon and Burma, Butterflies, Vol. 1:
Male: Upperside: closely resembles D. dipaea in the ground-colour and markings, but on the hind wing the markings are broader and more diffuse, and the lobe has a short filamentous black white-edged tail. Underside a brighter brown than in D. dipaea; the markings very similar, but twice as broad.
Expanse: 38-49 mm
Habitat: The Himalayas from Murree to Bhutan; Assam, the Khasi and Jaintia Hills.
Larva: More or less onisciform, pale emerald-green with two dorsal blue lines somewhat sparingly covered with short hairs, it Feeds on grasses and hill-bamboo.
Pupa: pale green, with cross check o£ darker green lines. Head bifid, flat in front and angulated below.

Subspecies
D. e. eugenes Sikkim to Assam to Burma, Tibet, Himalayas (west as far as Murree), Northeast India (hills), North Thailand, Indo China, West China. 
D. e. chaseni Corbet, 1941   Peninsular Malaya
D. e. venox Fruhstorfer, 1912  Sikkim, Assam, Yunnan
 D. e. esakii Shirôzu, 1953   Formosa
D. e. formosana Matsumura, 1919  Taiwan

See also
List of butterflies of India
List of butterflies of India (Riodinidae)

References

Biology
The larva feeds on  Adundinaria

Dodona (butterfly)
Fauna of Pakistan
Butterflies of Asia